The 1978–79 season of the European Cup Winners' Cup was won by FC Barcelona in the final in Basel against Fortuna Düsseldorf. It was the first of four occasions that the Spanish club won the tournament.

No club from Finland, Albania and Turkey joined this season.

First round 

|}

First leg

Second leg

Barcelona won 4–1 on aggregate.

Internazionale won 8–1 on aggregate.

Fortuna Düsseldorf won 5–4 on aggregate.

Second round 

|}

First leg

Second leg

Internazionale won 7–1 on aggregate.

Quarter-finals 

|}

First leg

Second leg

Barcelona 2–2 Ipswich Town on aggregate. Barcelona won on away goals

K.S.K. Beveren won 1–0 on aggregate

Fortuna Düsseldorf won 1–1 on away goals

Semi-finals 

|}

First leg

Second leg

Barcelona won 2–0 on aggregate.

Fortuna Düsseldorf won 4–3 on aggregate.

Final

See also
1978–79 European Cup
1978–79 UEFA Cup

External links 
 1978-79 competition at UEFA website
 Cup Winners' Cup results at Rec.Sport.Soccer Statistics Foundation
  Cup Winners Cup Seasons 1978-79–results, protocols
 website Football Archive  1978–79 Cup Winners Cup

3
UEFA Cup Winners' Cup seasons